Johan Axel Gustaf Törneman (28 October 1880 – 26 December 1925) was one of Sweden's earliest modernist painters. Born in Persberg, Värmland, in Sweden, he grew to work in several modernist styles, was one of the first Swedish expressionist artists, and became a part of the international avant-garde in art after embracing more abstract art styles in Germany and France that were evolving there during the early 1900s. He created his most famous paintings, Night Café I and II, and Trait, in France in 1905. These night café paintings, made from studies in the Place Pigalle, and in other nightclubs popular with artists such as Café du Rat Mort (Dead Rat Café), are seen as two of Swedish modernism's most important works, and are considered breakthrough work of Swedish modernism.

Törneman gained international stature in 1905 at the Salon d'Automne in Paris with Trait I, and with his Narragansett Café in 1906. He went on to paint murals and decorations in public buildings such as the Royal Institute of Technology (KTH) and Stockholm City Hall, and other Stockholm buildings such as Norra Latin, Ragnar Östberg's Östermalms läroverkl, and the second chamber in the Parliament House. Törneman's paintings were recognized with a gold medal at the U.S. Panama–Pacific International Exposition, in San Francisco in 1915. Törneman died in Stockholm at age 45 after only a further decade of creative work.

Education, travel, and early work
Johan Axel Gustaf Törneman was born on 28 October 1880 in Persberg, Värmland Sweden, the son of John Algot Törneman, an engineer at an explosives factory; his grandmother was the cookbook author Gustafva Bjorklund.

Törneman studied at Värmland School of Art in Göteborg in 1899 under Carl Wilhelmson, then toured the Nordic lands for a short while before traveling to study on the European continent in the years 1900–1905. In Europe, he first studied at the Kunstakademie München (now the Akademie der Bildenden Künste München), then went to Dachau to study under Adolf Hölzel.  In Munich he was influenced by the Art Nouveau movement and symbolism, Arnold Böcklin, Franz Stuck, and others.

Törneman grew to work in several modernist styles, was one of the first Swedish expressionist artists, and became a part of the international avant-garde in art after having embraced the then-new, more abstract art style in Germany and France during the early 1900s.

Career in France and Sweden

After leaving Germany, Törneman was active in Paris for four years, and also in the Breton village of Coudeville, Brittany. In Paris he studied at the Académie Julian, where after seeing van Gogh's and Gauguin's work, he brightened his palette. During his time in Paris, Törneman's friends were able to locate him by following the sketches he left in Paris cafés.

Törneman had a small studio in Paris at 7 rue de Bagneux. His night café paintings, based on studies in Place Pigalle, and a Paris nightclub popular with artists, Café du Rat Mort (Dead Rat Café), are two of Swedish modernism's most important works, though Törneman was less influenced by the French modernists than by the Germans. Three of these, his most famous paintings, Night Café I and II, and Trait, he painted in 1905 while in France. Törneman gained international stature in that same year, in the Salon d'Automne in Paris, for Trait I, and for Narragansett Café in 1906.

Returning from the continent, he moved to Stockholm, to Katarinavägen, next door to the studio of main competitor and critic of his work, Isaac Grünewald. Although another of his studios (on Södermalm in Stockholm) was in the same building as the sculptor and fellow Värmlander Christian Eriksson, he did not work with Eriksson's group at the Rackstad colony in Arvika. Some of Törneman's contemporaries included Sigrid Hjertén (1885–1948), Gösta Von Hennigs (1866–1941) and Leander Engström (1886–1927).

Törneman was recognized with a gold medal at the U.S. Panama–Pacific International Exposition, in San Francisco in 1915. Törneman traveled intermittently in relation to his art (e.g., in 1912, to Venice), and toward the end of his life, he largely abandoned his early dark palette, and instead worked almost entirely in the brighter colors from his Paris days.

Mural work
In addition to his many paintings on canvas, at various times in his career Törneman produced illustrations for commercial projects, as well as painting frescos and large scale murals in public spaces, such as the Royal Institute of Technology (KTH), Stockholm City Hall, other Stockholm buildings such as Norra Latin, Östermalms läroverk, Östra Real, and the second chamber of the Parliament House. Törneman began the ceiling mural De elektriska strömmarna (The electric currents), in 1918 in a lecture hall of the KTH. This very ambitions painting project was a subject of much discussion, and when completed was unanimously praised by critics, but disappeared from view until its rediscovery.

During the 1950s, the ceiling painting De elektriska disappeared, having been hidden behind a new ceiling during a renovation; with time, speculation arose that it had been destroyed during construction at its KTH site. After nearly 40 years, and its being near forgotten, De elektriska was found during 1993 repairs to its original building, intact, though a ventilation duct had been installed through it. The painting, still considered an important part of Swedish cultural heritage, was restored and moved—a thin layer of it was removed with great care and affixed to a new support in its new location—work that took a year and cost five-times as much as commission for the original artwork; it re-opened to the public in its new location, in 1994.

Personal life
Törneman married the Norwegian chanteuse Gudrun Høyer-Ellefsen (1875-1963), whom he had met in Paris during his time there, in 1908. His son Algot Törneman, later became an artist in his own right, and it was he who Törneman pictured in his 1921 painting Algot med teddybjörn (Algot with teddybear). Axel Törneman died in Stockholm at 45, after several hospitalizations, from gastrointestinal causes (assigned at the time as bleeding ulcers).

Legacy
Törneman has been referred to as "[o]ne of the most important pioneers of Swedish art". Törneman's letters, some sketchbooks, paintings, and some of his personal belongings are preserved at the Kungliga biblioteket ("Royal Library"), in the National Library of Sweden, in Stockholm.

In 1965 the Moderna Museet, in Stockholm ("Modern Museum", a museum of modern art) held a major retrospective exhibition of his work, 40 years after his death.

Selected works

See also
 Moderna Museet
 Blue Room in Stockholm City Hall
 Kiruna City Hall
 Swedish art
 List of Swedish artists
 Swedish language Wikipedia
 Nationalencyklopedin

References

Further reading

Exhibition catalogs
 Axel Törneman och kvinnan, Moderna museet, Exhibition Catalog, Stockholm, 1965. .
 Moser, Claes, and Newall, Christopher, Axel Törneman, an Eccentric Swedish Colourist: 17 May to 1 June 1989, Leighton House Museum. (exhibition catalog) 
 Söderlund, Göran, ed., Axel Törneman. Millesgården, Stockholm, 1990. Cat. no. 24. (exhibition catalog) .
 Theorell, Anita, et al., Axel Törneman, Millesgården, Stockholm, 1990. (utställningskatalog) (exhibition catalog).

Other works
 Axel Törneman : artist file, study photographs and reproductions of works of art with accompanying documentation 1920–2000, Frick Art Reference Library of The Frick Collection. Accessed 2012-12-19. 
 Theorell, Anita, Studier kring Axel Törnemans Riksdagshus Målningar, (Studies on Axel Törneman Parliament building's Paintings; academic dissertation), Stockholm, 1973 (Museum Stavanger Biblioteket, Norway, (STAVMUS, bibl, 75(485))).
 Källström, Magnus, Nattcafé. Om Axel Törnemans tid i Paris 1902 – 1906, Stockholm 1988. (Night Café. Axel Törnemans's time in Paris)
 Källström, Magnus, Torgny Lagman: Axel Törnemans ma°lningar i riksdagshuset, (Parliament House), Stockholm, Sandler, 1990. .
 Rausing, Birgit, et al., Signums svenska konsthistoria, Konsten 1890 – 1915, Lund 2001, s. 283ff, (Signums Swedish art history). .
 Axel Törneman, Search, New York Art Resources Consortium, arcade.nyarc.org. Accessed 2012-12-20.

External links

 Swedish National Museum, Törneman items. Accessed 2015-11-16.
 Troll Painters, Axel Törneman (1880–1925), short essay on the work The Troll King and the Princess, 1905. Accessed 2012-12-19.
 Norra Latin mural. Accessed 2012-12-19.
 Galleri Claes Moser, Törneman's estate agent, also runs the JAG Acke Museum in Ljusterö, gallerimoser.com. Accessed 2015-11-16.
 Axel Törneman Törneman works that have been auctioned, Stockholms Auktionsverk, auktionsverket.com. Accessed 2012-12-20. Major Stockholm art auction house. See also Vid pianot, (At the Piano), an unsold Törneman work at Stockholms Auktionsverk, 2011-12-06. Accessed 2012-12-19. (in Swedish) (Google translate)
 Axel Törneman on Artnet, Past auctions of works, artnet.com. Accessed 2012-12-20.

20th-century Swedish painters
Swedish male painters
Modern painters
1880 births
1925 deaths
People from Filipstad Municipality
Deaths from ulcers
20th-century Swedish male artists